Events from the year 1844 in Denmark.

Incumbents
 Monarch – Christian VIII
 Prime minister – Poul Christian Stemann

Events
 Søren Kierkegaard publishes Philosophical Fragments.

Undated

Births
 12 January – Louis Hasselriis, sculptor (died 1912)
 1 February – Ernst Immanuel Cohen Brandes, economist, writer, and editor (died 1892)
 11 April – Vilhelm Herman Oluf Madsen, politician (died 1917)
 12 June
 Klaus Berntsen, politician (died 1927)
 Oscar Alexander Ræder, writer (died 1877)
 20 September  Emilie West, educator (died 1907)
 1 December – Alexandra of Denmark, queen-empress consort of King Edward VII of the United Kingdom (died 1925 in the United Kingdom)
 4 December – Henrik Franz Alexander von Eggers, soldier and botanist (died 1903)
 6 December – Rogert Møller, architect (died 1918)

Deaths
 7 March – Christian Horneman, miniature  painter (born 1765)
 15 March – Adam August Müller, painter (born 1811)
 24 March – Bertel Thorvaldsen, sculptor (born 1770)
 16 December – Johan Ernst Hartmann, organist and composer (born 1770)
 24 December – Friedrich Bernhard Westphal, painter (born 1803)

References

 
1840s in Denmark
Denmark
Years of the 19th century in Denmark